{{DISPLAYTITLE:C7H6O6}}
The molecular formula C7H6O6 (molar mass: 186.11 g/mol, exact mass: 186.01643790 u) may refer to:

 3-Carboxy-cis,cis-muconic acid
 3-Fumarylpyruvic acid
 3-Maleylpyruvic acid

Molecular formulas